Filatima occidua is a moth of the family Gelechiidae. It is found in North America, where it has been recorded from Washington and California.

The length of the forewings is 5.5-6.2 mm. The forewings are dark grey, yellowish-brown tipped scales on the basal one-fifth, dark-grey tipped scales from one-fifth to four-fifths and dark-brown tipped scales at the apex, a brown spot at three-fifths of the cell and a dark-brown blotch at the end of the cell.

The larvae on Lupinus sericeus var. sericeus and Lupinus ornatus.

Etymology
The species name refers to its distribution and is derived from Latin occiduus (meaning setting [of the sun]).

References

Moths described in 1997
Filatima